The 1932 College Basketball All-Southern Team consisted of basketball players from the South chosen at their respective positions.

All-Southerns

Guards
Tom Alexander, North Carolina (C-1)
T. W. Lumpkin, Auburn (C-1)
Louis Berger, Maryland (C-2)
Wilmer Hines, North Carolina (C-2)

Forwards
Virgil Weathers, North Carolina (C-1)
Leroy Young, Georgia (C-1)
Vernon "Catfish" Smith, Georgia (C-2)
James Thompson, Duke (C-2)

Center
Bill Strickland, Georgia (C-1)
Forest Sale, Kentucky (C-2)

Key
C = consensus, denoted with 1 for first-team and 2 for second-team

References

All-Southern